"Élan" is a single by Finnish symphonic metal band Nightwish, the first from their eighth album Endless Forms Most Beautiful. The song marks the first Nightwish song to feature its newest frontwoman, Dutch singer Floor Jansen, on vocals, and also the first to feature Troy Donockley as a full-time member and Kai Hahto as a temporary replacement for Jukka Nevalainen.

The song was announced on December 8, 2014 at the band's official website. According to keyboardist and songwriter Tuomas Holopainen, the song is "a wonderful teaser for the full-length album, giving out a little taste, but revealing very little of the actual journey of grandeur to come." The music video for the song features several famous Finnish actors and was "inspired by the untold stories of abandoned places around Finland".

The single also contains the song "Sagan", a bonus track not released on Endless Forms Most Beautiful. The song is about astrophysicist and science popularizer Carl Sagan. Tuomas said the band intended to include the track in the album track-list, but it would exceed the 80-minutes limit of a conventional CD, so they left the track out of it.

Composition 
According to Holopainen, the starting point to write the song was a citation by Walt Whitman (described by him as his "hero Uncle Walt"): "'Oh, while I live to be the ruler of life, Not a slave
To meet life as a powerful conqueror, and nothing exterior to me will ever take command of me". He commented: "The underlying theme of the song is nothing less than the meaning of life, which can be something different for all of us. It's important to surrender yourself to the occasional 'free fall' and not to fear the path less travelled by." "Élan" was considered by bassist and vocalist Marko Hietala one of his favorite songs, and he sees it as a work that talks about living one's life to the fullest.

When asked about the meaning of the word "élan", Hietala said he heard from Holopainen that "it is a metaphor for this hunger and thirst for life, for the right here and now and the 'go at it and get it'."

Leak controversy 
The official debut date was February 13, 2015, though it was leaked online several days before. At that time, the band's official Facebook page posted a screenshot of a Mexican Facebook user supposedly making the song available via Google Drive. The post said "People, not like this please.", and it was met with criticism by some of the fans, who felt the band was exposing the user responsible for sharing the link, while others defended the group. A couple of hours later, the band released a statement on their Facebook page:

The user responsible for publicizing the leak later changed his profile name and released a statement saying that he was now being harassed by many people and that Nightwish was to blame in case anything happens to him. The day after, Holopainen and the band released another statement:

On the day the single was officially released, Holopainen told Metal Hammer that he "would have done a few things differently" regarding the episode, but still regretted the song's premature leak. On a later interview, when asked if she sees a leak as something inevitable nowadays, Floor Jansen said "No, absolutely not". She also commented:

Track listing 
CD version

Vinyl version

Personnel 
Nightwish
 Floor Jansen – lead vocals
 Marko Hietala – bass, male vocals (on track 1,2,3)
 Emppu Vuorinen – guitars
 Tuomas Holopainen – keyboards, piano
 Troy Donockley – uilleann pipes, tin whistle, backing vocals (on track 1,2,3)

Additional musicians
 Kai Hahto – drums
 Pip Williams – orchestral arrangements
 James Shearman – Conductor
 Metro Voices – choir

Production
 Tuomas Holopainen – production, mixing
 Mikko Karmilla, Tero Kinnunen – mixing
 Mika Jussila – mastering
 Toxic Angel – cover art

Charts

References

External links 
 

2015 songs
Songs written by Tuomas Holopainen
Nuclear Blast Records singles
Nightwish songs